
Gmina Tymbark is a rural gmina (administrative district) in Limanowa County, Lesser Poland Voivodeship, in southern Poland.

Villages
Gmina Tymbark contains the villages and settlements of Piekiełko, Podłopień, Zamieście and Zawadka.

Neighbouring gminas
Gmina Tymbark is bordered by the town of Limanowa and by the gminas of Dobra, Jodłownik, Limanowa and Słopnice.

References
Polish official population figures 2006

Tymbark
Limanowa County